Zinc finger protein 507 is a protein that in humans is encoded by the ZNF507 gene.

References

Further reading 

Human proteins